Signal Hill may refer to:

Places

Canada
 Signal Hill, Calgary, neighborhood and hill in Calgary, Alberta
 Signal Hill-Quidi Vidi, provincial electoral district for the Newfoundland and Labrador House of Assembly
 Signal Hill, St. John's, a hill near St. John's, Newfoundland and Labrador
 Signal Hill (British Columbia), a shoreline hill at HMC Dockyard, Esquimalt, British Columbia

United States
 Signal Hill, the tallest point of Arkansas on the top of Mount Magazine
 Signal Hill, California, small town completely surrounded by Long Beach
 Signal Hill, Illinois, an unincorporated community
 Signal Hill (Barnstable County, Massachusetts), a summit
 Signal Hill (Canton, Massachusetts), a rocky knoll and open space preserve
 Signal Hill (Culpeper, Virginia), listed on the National Register of Historic Places in Culpeper County, Virginia
 Signal Hill (Prince William County, Virginia), listed on the National Register of Historic Places in Prince William County, Virginia

Other places
 Signal Hill (Antigua and Barbuda)
Signal Hill (Cape Town), South Africa
Signal Hill (England)
 Signal Hill, Kowloon, in the Tsim Sha Tsui area, Hong Kong also known as Blackhead Point
Signal Hill (Lytton), in Brisbane, Queensland, Australia
 Signal Hill (New Zealand)
 Signal Hill (Qingdao), China

Music
 Signal Hill (album), a 2002 album by Australian singer songwriter Monique Brumby

See also
 Battle of Signal Hill, fought at St. John's, Newfoundland during the French and Indian War
 Signal Hill Elementary School (disambiguation)
 List of peaks named Signal
 Signalberg (disambiguation)